In 1917, Walter Steinhart became the first motorcyclist to reach the summit of Snoqualmie Pass. At least several miles of the journey were undertaken under conditions of heavy snow. The Indian Powerplus motorcycle Steinhart rode was able to make better progress than a man leading a horse that he passed.

On January 1, 1917 Steinhart finished first among ten riders in a 180-mile course twice around Lake Washington in a time of 3 hours, 20 minutes. On August 20 of that year, Steinhart competed in the Seattle MC Contest Seattle-North Yakima-Goldendale-White-Salmon-Portland enduro and finished third behind G. C. Austin and Ray Smith. His Indian lost ground between North Yakima and Goldendale.

References

Enduro riders